Helen Adam (December 2, 1909 in Glasgow, Scotland – September 19, 1993 in New York City) was a Scottish poet, collagist and photographer who was part of a literary movement contemporaneous to the Beat Generation that occurred in San Francisco during the 1950s and 1960s. Though often associated with the Beat poets, she would more accurately be considered one of the predecessors of the Beat Generation.

Life 
Adam was a precocious poet; her first book, The Elfin Pedlar, was published in 1923, when the poet was 14 years old. That book was in the Victorian genre of light verse about fairies and other pastoral subjects. Her early books were well known and widely reviewed; the composer Sir Charles Villiers Stanford set selections from The Elfin Pedlar to orchestral music, and performed them widely.

Adam attended the University of Edinburgh for two years. After leaving the university she worked as a journalist in London. In 1939 she moved to the United States and eventually moved to San Francisco. In San Francisco she worked with such influential poets as Allen Ginsberg and Robert Duncan. Adam also developed her first theater piece, 'San Francisco's Burning', a play with music, as well as unique visual designs & curtain by the San Francisco artist Gary Swartzburg, who worked with her on various theater projects prior to her moving to New York. One of the oldest of the poets in the San Francisco Renaissance, she worked closely with Duncan, Jess, Madeline Gleason, and Jack Spicer, among others. She also encouraged many of the Beat poets as they began to explore performance and writing as an art form. While her continued use of the ballad form "mystified" many of the poets more associated with the movement, the "magic and knowledge she brought to San Francisco startled the young wild sages of its Renaissance with a special kind of madness."

Helen Adam and her sister collaborated on a ballad opera entitled San Francisco's Burning which was published in 1963 and reissued in 1985 with score by Al Carmines and drawings by Jess. A collection of her poems was collected in a work titled Selected Poems and Ballads. She was one of only four women whose work was included in Donald Allen's landmark anthology, The New American Poetry 1945-1960 (1960). Adam also appeared in several films: "Flotsum", a 45-minute art film done in San Francisco by her friend, the artist Gary Swartzburg, Poetry in Motion by Ron Mann, Death and Our Corpses Speak by German experimental film maker Rosa von Praunheim.

Her papers are held at University at Buffalo, The State University of New York, and Kent State University.

Awards 
 1981 American Book Award

Poem 
An example of Helen Adam's verse with its striking use of language is "Margaretta's Rime":

Collages
From Kristin Prevallet: "In a dark forest, a woman in a white strapless evening gown is stiffly toppling into the arms of a gigantic tarantula. One of her arms is nestled comfortably between the spider's strong, hairy forearms, and she appears comfortable with the monstrosity that is cuddling her. In another scene two bats are attached to the sleeve of an elegant lady's gown, dangling as if a part of her ensemble. The society debutantes around her appear to be oblivious to the grotesque attachment. The lady does have a slightly uncomfortable expression on her face, but it is not the bats that are making her nervous. Rather, she is worried that her private passions will be discovered by the outside world. She reassures herself, 'perhaps no one will notice them.' As in all of the collages of Helen Adam, the true desires of women are fulfilled not by mortal men, but by highly charged encounters with unhuman beings."

Helen Adam, whom the poet Robert Duncan once referred to as "the extraordinary nurse of enchantment," was an active participant in The San Francisco Renaissance, a literary movement contemporaneous to the Beat Generation that occurred in San Francisco during the 1950s and 60s. Born in Scotland in 1909, Adam primarily wrote supernatural ballads which tell of fatal romances, darkly sadistic sexual affairs, jealous lovers, and vengeful demons. Her collages arise from these ballads, and animate what she called her "lethal women." She assembled the majority of her collages in the late 1950s, having been influenced by the procedures of the well-known collage artist and painter Jess who was also living in San Francisco during this time. Jess's collages are a myriad of images, fitted like pieces of a puzzle which come together to form one visionary grande-collage. Universes of tiny details and connections are assembled together, a process that reflects the palimpsistic layering of contemporary poetry as much as it does the found-object and assemblage movements that are central to modern art. When compared to Jess's collages, Adam's are strikingly simple. They combine two images—a beautiful man or woman, and a creature. And this combination results in an ironic playfulness that teases the viewer to wonder: are these collages a form of self-portrait, a projection of this woman's deep fears mingled with her repressed desire?"

Selected publications 
 The Elfin Pedlar and Tales Told by the Pixie Pool, New York, London, G.P. Putnam's Sons, 1924. 
 Charms and Dreams from the Elfin Pedlar's Pack, 1924
 Shadow of the Moon, 1929
 The Queen O' Crow Castle, 1958
 Ballads, 1964
 Counting Out Rhyme, 1972
 Selected Poems and Ballads, 1974
 Ghosts and Grinning Shadows (a collection of short stories), Hanging Loose Press, 1977 
 Turn Again to Me and Other Poems, Kulchur Foundation, 1977. 
 Gone Sailing, West Branch, Iowa: Toothpaste Press, 1980. , 
 Songs with Music, 1982
 The Bells of Dis, Coffee House Press, 1985. , 
 (With Auste Adam) Stone Cold Gothic, N.Y., N.Y. : Kulchur Foundation, 1984. , 
 "San Francisco's Burning", 1985; Brooklyn Hanging Loose Press, 1999. , 
 A Helen Adam Reader. Edited with notes and an introduction by Kristin Prevallet, Orono : National Poetry Foundation, 2007. ,

References

External links 

Helen Adam Author Page at Electronic Poetry Center includes extensive links to online works and biography
Helen Adam's Sweet Company essay by Kristin Prevallet
"The Reluctant Pixie Poole", A Recovery of Helen Adam's San Francisco Years, Kristin Prevallet, 1995
Helen Adam Artwork (collages) from the University at Buffalo Libraries

1909 births
1993 deaths
American women poets
British emigrants to the United States
Writers from Glasgow
20th-century Scottish women writers
Writers from the San Francisco Bay Area
Alumni of the University of Edinburgh
20th-century American poets
American Book Award winners
20th-century American women writers